The Golden Fetter is a 1917 American romance silent film directed by Edward LeSaint and written by Charles Tenney Jackson and Charles Maigne. The film stars Wallace Reid, Anita King, Tully Marshall, Guy Oliver, Walter Long, and Mrs. Lewis McCord. The film was released on January 25, 1917, by Paramount Pictures.

Plot

Cast 
Wallace Reid as James Roger Ralston
Anita King as Faith Miller
Tully Marshall as Henry Slade
Guy Oliver as Edson
Walter Long as McGill
Mrs. Lewis McCord as Big Annie
Clarence Geldart as Flynn 
Lawrence Peyton as Buck Hanson
Lucien Littlefield as Pete

References

External links 
 

1917 films
American romance films
1910s romance films
Paramount Pictures films
Films directed by Edward LeSaint
American black-and-white films
American silent feature films
1910s English-language films
1910s American films